Jules Gill-Peterson is an American historian specializing in transgender history. She is an associate professor of history at Johns Hopkins University. Her best known work is the 2018 book Histories of the Transgender Child, which documented the pervasiveness of children identifying as transgender in the United States well before the twenty-first century. This book received a Lambda Literary Award for Transgender Literature and the Children’s Literature Association Book Award. She is a general co-editor of Transgender Studies Quarterly, and previously served as a research fellow at the American Council of Learned Societies and at the Kinsey Institute. In 2020, she received a Chancellor’s Distinguished Research Award from the University of Pittsburgh, where she previously served as a faculty member. She received her B.A. degree from the University of Ottawa in 2010 and her Ph.D. from Rutgers University in 2015.

References

External links

Faculty page

Living people
Year of birth missing (living people)
American women historians

Transgender women
Johns Hopkins University faculty
21st-century American historians
University of Ottawa alumni
Rutgers University alumni
University of Pittsburgh faculty